Adventure comics may refer to:

 Adventure comics, a genre of adventure fiction
 Adventure Comics, an American comic book series